Cremolino is a comune (municipality) in the Province of Alessandria in the Italian region Piedmont, located about  southeast of Turin and about  south of Alessandria.

Cremolino borders the following municipalities: Cassinelle, Molare, Morbello, Morsasco, Ovada, Prasco, and Trisobbio.

References

External links
 www.cremolino.com/

Cities and towns in Piedmont